Fuyuan Road Bridge is a beam arch bridge crossing over the Xiang River in Changsha, Hunan, China. It connects Yuelu District and Kaifu District. It was made of steel and concrete. The bridge has six lanes, separated by a railing.

History
Plans for a bridge had been made in 2008. Construction of the bridge started on September 27, 2010 and completed on May 18, 2012. It was put into operation on November 20, 2012.

References

Steel bridges in China
Concrete bridges in China
Bridges completed in 2012
Bridges in Hunan
2012 establishments in China